Deh Vazir (also Romanized as Deh Vazīr; also known as Deh-e Zīr) is a village in Qatruyeh Rural District, Qatruyeh District, Neyriz County, Fars Province, Iran. At the 2006 census, its population was 12, in 5 families.

References 

Populated places in Neyriz County